Shylah Te Uranga Mariu Waikai (born 27 August 2000, Hamilton, New Zealand) is a New Zealand amateur boxer residing in Coomera, Queensland. Waikai biggest accomplishment so far in her career is winning the Silver medal at the 2017 Commonwealth Youth Games in the Flyweight division. In October 2017, Waikai announced that she will be competing in the 2017 India AIBA Youth World Boxing Championships.

Notable tournament results

2017 Bahamas Commonwealth Youth Games

Results
Women's (Youth Division) Fly (51 kg)
 Round of Preliminary (1st Match): Shylah Waikai, New Zealand (4)  def Madumali Eranga Marappuli Henayale, Sri Lanka (1)
 Round of Quarterfinals  (2nd Match):Shylah Waikai, New Zealand (5)  def Helena Ismael Bagao, Mozambique (0)
 Round of Semifinals  (3rd Match):Shylah Waikai, New Zealand (5)  def Megan Elizabeth Gordon, Scotland (0)
 Round of Finals  (4th Match):Shylah Waikai, New Zealand (0)   lost Chloe Louise Watson, England (5)

Amateur titles
3 x Australian Golden Gloves Champion
4 x Queensland State Champion 
New Zealand National Champion
Silver Medal 2017 Commonwealth Youth Games

References

External links
 New Zealand Olympic Committee Athletes Profile
 Awakening Fighters Profile

2000 births
Living people
New Zealand women boxers
Sportspeople from Hamilton, New Zealand